Snowy mespilus refers to species of trees or shrubs in the genus Amelanchier:-

Amelanchier lamarckii
Amelanchier ovalis